Jagoda is a gender-neutral surname and feminine given name. Especially common in Poland and Croatia, it means "berry" or "strawberry" in Slavic languages. Other forms include Jahoda (Czech and Slovak), Yahoda (Ukrainian), and Yagoda (Russian).

As a surname
 Andy S. Jagoda, American medical academic
 Dhamma Jagoda (1941–1988), Indian dramatist
 Flory Jagoda (1923–2021), American guitarist
 Marcin Jagoda (born 1980), American volleyball player
 Wojciech Jagoda (born 1962), Polish footballer

As a given name
 Jagoda Buić (born 1930), Croatian visual artist
 Jagoda Kaloper (1947–2016), Croatian painter
 Jagoda Kibil (born 1999), Polish Paralympic athlete
 Jagoda Marinić (born 1977), German author
 Jagoda Pike, Canadian business executive of Croatian origin
 Jagoda Stach (born 1983), Polish child actress
 Jagoda Szmytka (born 1982), Polish composer
 Jagoda Truhelka (1864–1957), Yugoslav writer and pedagogist

See also
 
 Yagoda

Given names
Polish-language surnames
Polish feminine given names
Slavic feminine given names